Gémonval is a commune in the Doubs department in the Bourgogne-Franche-Comté region in eastern France.

Coal mines were operated in the village between 1826 and 1944.

Population

See also
 Communes of the Doubs department

References

Communes of Doubs